Jon Taylor is an American re-recording mixer. He has been nominated for four Academy Awards in the category Best Sound Mixing. He has worked on nearly 120 films since 1989. He won two Emmy Awards for Outstanding Sound Mixing for the television show Flipper in 1996–1997.

Selected filmography
 The Revenant (2015)
 Birdman (2014)
 Unbroken (2014)
 First Man (2018)

References

External links

Year of birth missing (living people)
Living people
American audio engineers
Best Sound BAFTA Award winners